George Mackie may refer to:

 George Mackie, Baron Mackie of Benshie (1919–2015), Scottish Liberal politician
 George Owen Mackie (born 1929), British–Canadian zoologist
 George Mackie (footballer) (born 1954), Scottish footballer
 George Mackie (book designer), book designer and Royal Designer for Industry
 George Mackie (rugby union) (1949–2020), Scottish rugby union player

See also
 George Mackey (1916–2006), mathematician
 George Mackay (disambiguation)